Peter Sendscheid (born 28 September 1965) is a retired German footballer. He played as a striker for Alemannia Aachen and Schalke 04 in the Bundesliga and 2. Bundesliga.

Career statistics

References

External links 
 

1965 births
Living people
German footballers
Association football forwards
Bundesliga players
2. Bundesliga players
Alemannia Aachen players
FC Schalke 04 players